Cyperus virens is a species of sedge that is native to southern parts of North America, Central America and South America.

See also 
 List of Cyperus species

References 

virens
Plants described in 1803
Flora of Brazil
Flora of Mexico
Flora of Alabama
Flora of Georgia (U.S. state)
Flora of Florida
Flora of Texas
Flora of South Carolina
Flora of Argentina
Flora of Bolivia
Flora of Chile
Flora of Colombia
Flora of Costa Rica
Flora of Cuba
Flora of the Dominican Republic
Flora of Guatemala
Flora of Haiti
Flora of Honduras
Flora of Louisiana
Flora of Jamaica
Flora of Mississippi
Flora of North Carolina
Flora of Panama
Flora of Paraguay
Flora of Puerto Rico
Flora of Suriname
Flora of Uruguay
Flora of Venezuela
Flora of El Salvador
Taxa named by André Michaux